Louis Barès (born 27 July 1930) is a French racing cyclist. He rode in the 1953 Tour de France.

References

1930 births
Living people
French male cyclists
Place of birth missing (living people)